Peter Theurer (born 30 July 1969) is a Swiss sailor. He competed in the Finn event at the 2000 Summer Olympics.

References

External links
 

1969 births
Living people
Swiss male sailors (sport)
Olympic sailors of Switzerland
Sailors at the 2000 Summer Olympics – Finn
Place of birth missing (living people)
20th-century Swiss people